The China International Development Cooperation Agency (CIDCA) is a foreign aid agency of the People's Republic of China. It is directly subordinate to the State Council. It was created to "achieve better coordination and greater impact" of China's aid programs, particularly in support of the Belt and Road Initiative.

CIDCA was founded in April 2018. It was formerly the Department of Foreign Aid of the Ministry of Commerce (MOFCOM).

See also 
 Chinese foreign aid
 Foreign aid to China
 Exim Bank of China

References

External links

Further reading 
 Thier, A. et al. (2018) China's new development agency: five experts' views. London: Overseas Development Institute.

International development agencies
State Council of the People's Republic of China
Chinese foreign aid